Perm Governorate was an administrative unit of the Russian Empire and the Soviet Union from 1781 to 1923. It was also known as the government of Perm. It was located on both slopes of the Ural Mountains, and its administrative center was the city of Perm. The region gave its name to the Permian period.

History 
On November 20 (December 1), 1780, Catherine II signed a decree establishing the governorship of Perm in the two regions – Perm and Yekaterinburg, and the establishment of the provincial city of Perm. The first Governor-General of Perm and Tobol regions was appointed Lieutenant-General Yevgeny Petrovich Kashkin. In accordance with the decree of Emperor Paul I of December 12, 1796 "A new division of the state in the province", Perm and Tobolsk governor-generalship was divided in Perm and Tobolsk Governorates. On July 15, 1919, from the Perm province has been allocated Yekaterinburg Governorate, consisting of 6 uyezds, located in the east, beyond the Urals. On November 4, 1920, its membership was included Sarapulsky Uyezd of Vyatka Governorate. On November 3, 1923, Perm province was abolished and its territory was included in the Ural Oblast with its center in Yekaterinburg.

Geography 
Perm Governorate was bordered with Vologda Governorate (to the north), Tobolsk Governorate (to the east), Orenburg and Ufa governorates (to the south) and Vyatka Governorate (to the west).
Governorate's area was 332,052 km2, 181,000 of them – in Europe and 151,000 – in Asia. Ural mountains, that crossed governorate from north to south for 640 km was a border between European and Asian parts. Highest point of governorate was Konzhakovsky Kamen (1565 m). European part of Perm governorate situated in basin of Kama River, Asian part – in basin of Tobol River. Drainage basin of Pechora River occupied extreme north of Cherdynsky Uyezd.

Industry and agriculture

Industry 
The Perm Governorate was one of the main centres of mining, metallurgical and metal-processing industries of the Russian Empire. In the middle of the XIX century, there were 4 fiscal and 18 private mining districts on the territory of the province, the largest industrial centres were Yekaterinburg and Motovilikha Plant in Perm suburbs. At the beginning of the 19th century in the Governorate 9 state enterprises, 69 private and possession plants, about 300 mines, 13 salterns, 14 coal mines, gold, platinum and silver mines were operated. At the turn of the 19th and 20th centuries, joint-stock companies arose (11 in metallurgy, 12 in gold-platinum), including those with French, Belgian and British capital. In the 1910s, there were more than 260 thousand workers in the province, 80% of the enterprises had more than 500 workers.

The mining enterprises (mining and production of copper, iron, steel and pig iron, gold, platinum, hard coal and salt) occupied the middle belt of the Governorate on the territory of the Ural mountain range and covered the districts of Perm, Solikamsk and Cherdynsk on the western side of the range and Verkhotursk, Ekaterinburg, Krasnoufimsk and parts of Kamyshlov and Irbit on the eastern side. By the beginning of the 20th century, the manufacture of simple agricultural machinery and implements, which were supplied outside the Governorate, had developed considerably.

Agriculture and trades 
Cereals (rye, oats, barley) were sown almost throughout the Governorate, but with different successes. The main producers were the southern districts - Shadrinsky, Kamyshlovsky, Krasnoufimsky and Osinsky. In the southern districts, significant quantities of wheat, millet and buckwheat were grown, as well as flax for seed production. In the Okha, Kungur, Perm and Irbit uyezds the yields were average, and in the Cherdyn, Verkhotursk, Solikamsk uyezds and the Ekaterinburg uyezd there was not enough bread even for the rural population. Vegetarianism was a widespread occupation, but not gardening - fruit bushes (gooseberry, raspberry) were bred. Beekeeping was developed in Krasnovfimsk, Osinsk, Okha and Kungur districts.

Cattle breeding was developed in the Shadrinsk uyezd among the Bashkirs. Horses were bred predominantly. Cattle were kept mainly for local needs. In the Cherdyn and Verkhotursk uyezds, the Mansi were engaged in reindeer breeding.

For the rural inhabitants of Solikamsk, Cherdyn and partly Verkhotursk districts hunting, wood felling, shipbuilding and charcoal burning for mining plants were subsidiary occupations. Due to the lack of artificial transport routes carriage trade was of vital importance. Zemstvo turned its attention to the development of dairy processing, hand weaving and beekeeping. On the initiative of zemstvo, in 1896, the instructors were sent to the province to teach the population the basics of butter and weaving. The development of cottage industries was promoted by the Artisanal and Industrial Bank of the Perm provincial zemstvo.

Administrative division 
Perm Governorate was divided into 12 uyezds.

European part:
Permsky Uyezd
Krasnoufimsky Uyezd
Kungursky Uyezd
Osinsky Uyezd
Okhansky Uyezd
Solikamsky Uyezd
Cherdynsky Uyezd
Asian part:
Verkhotursky Uyezd
Yekaterinburgsky Uyezd
Irbitsky Uyezd
Kamyshlovsky Uyezd
Shadrinsky Uyezd

Population 
In early 19th century, population of the governorate was approx. 940,000. According 1896 data, population of region was 2,968,472 (1,433,231 of them are male and 1,535,211 are female). According to the 1897 Census, population was 2,994,302.

Major cities were:
 Perm: 45,205
 Yekaterinburg: 43,239
 Irbit: 20,062

According 1897 Census, for 90.3% of governorate's population used Russian as their native language, 3.1% used Komi-permyak language, 2.9% – Bashkir language, 1.6% – Tatar language. Most of population was Orthodox Christians with Old Believers (7.29%) and Muslim (5.06%) minorities.

Economy 
The economy of governorate was based on industry, however in some parts of region prevailed agriculture sector. Arable lands was 33,000 km2 (approx. 9.53%  of total area). Main crops were: rye, oat and barley. Wheat was cultivated mostly in southern areas. Livestock breeding was well developed in Shadrinsky Uyezd, among Bashkir people. Despite plenty of rivers, fishing was developed only in Cherdynsky Uyezd. Commercial hunting was also only in the north of region, in Cherdynsky Uyezd.

Industry was based by mining, main minerals included copper, iron ore, gold, coal and salt. Most of mining and metallurgical plants was situated in central part of Ural Mountains. The Perm Governorate was well connected by railroads with other regions of Russian Empire. Main rivers also had great transport significance.

See also 
 Klimova Treasure

References 

 
1781 establishments in the Russian Empire
Governorates of the Russian Empire
History of Perm Krai
History of Sverdlovsk Oblast
History of Chelyabinsk Oblast
History of Kurgan Oblast
History of Udmurtia
Perm, Russia